Ukurey (also Komsomolsk and Areda) is an air base in Chitinskaja Oblast, Russia located 24 km southwest of Chernyshevsk.  It is a medium-size base with 2 parallel taxiways, tarmacs, and 12 revetments.   One anecdotal report suggests it serves Ilyushin Il-76 aircraft.

It was home to 193 Gv ORAP (193rd Guards Independent Reconnaissance Aviation Regiment) flying MiG-25RB, Yak-27, and Yak-28R aircraft in the 1980s. The regiment was disbanded in 1989.

References

RussianAirFields.com

Soviet Air Force bases
Soviet Frontal Aviation